The Hafun Fishing Company (HFC) is a fishing and real estate firm headquartered in Bosaso, the commercial capital of the autonomous Puntland regional state in northeastern Somalia.

Holdings

Fishing
The Hafun Fishing Company was established in July 1992 in Bosaso. It was named after the northeastern port town of Hafun, where HFC also has an office.

The firm exports a wide range of fish products to international markets. Among these are lobsters, frozen fish, dried shark meat and fin, which it mainly sends to Yemen, the United Arab Emirates and Oman in the Persian Gulf, as well as some products to Kenya in the African Great Lakes region. The company is also exploring additional global markets for its fish goods.

Real estate
Besides the fishing industry, HFC maintains business activities in Puntland's housing market. These commercial interests are represented by the firm's growing local real estate sales and development division.

Management
The Hafun Fishing Company is chaired by its founder, Mohamed Abshir Abdi. Said Farah Mohamoud serves as the firm's Managing Director at its main Bosaso office.

Additionally, Omar K. Yusuf is the Chief Integrity Controller of HFC's London branch.

See also
Bosaso Tannery
List of companies of Somalia

Notes

External links
Hafun Fishing Company

Real estate companies established in 1992
Companies of Somalia
1992 establishments in Somalia